The Electoral Bloc of Kunitsyn was a political alliance in Crimea led by Serhiy Kunitsyn.

It consisted of:
People's Democratic Party (Narodno-Demokratychna Partiya)
Democratic Party of Ukraine (Demokratychna Partiya Ukrayiny)
Party of the State Neutrality of Ukraine (Partiya derzhavnoho neitralitetu Ukrayiny)

Conclusion
At the parliamentary election, 26 March 2006, it won 7.63% of the popular vote and 10 seats in the regional parliament.

References

Defunct political party alliances in Ukraine
Political parties in Crimea